The 2005 Sun Belt Conference football season was an NCAA football season that was played from August 28, 2005, to January 6, 2006. The Sun Belt Conference consisted of 8 football members:  Arkansas State, Florida Atlantic, Florida International, Louisiana-Lafayette, Louisiana-Monroe, Middle Tennessee, North Texas, and Troy. Arkansas State, ULL, and ULM all shared the Sun Belt Championship.

References